Acanthurus leucosternon is a marine tropical fish belonging to the surgeonfish family, Acanthuridae. Its common names are powder blue tang and powder-blue surgeonfish.

Description
The fish can reach an average size of 23 cm (9 in) in length. The body has an oval shape and is compressed laterally. Like other surgeonfishes, Acanthurus leucosternon swims with its pectoral fins. The caudal fin has a crescent shape. The fish has a "surgeon's scalpel," an erected part of the spine located at the base of the tail. The mouth is small and pointed in a beak-like manner with tiny and sharp teeth for reaching narrow spaces of food. Its sides are blue; its dorsal fin and the base of caudal fin are yellow; the head is black; the mouth, the throat area, the anal and pelvic fins are white. The pectoral fins are transparent with yellow reflections. The intensity of its blue color shows off if the fish is healthy or not.
The fish does not undergo color changes as it matures; as some tangs, surgeonfish and unicornfish do.

Distribution and habitat
Acanthurus leucosternon is found in tropical waters from the Indian Ocean. The species inhabits shallow and clear coastal waters always associated with a reef. It prefers flat top reefs and areas along seaward slopes.

Behaviour
The powder blue tang, like most fish in the family Acanthuridae, is herbivorous, eating mostly benthic algae. Acanthurus leucosternon has a diurnal activity. It is solitary, territorial and aggressive with other surgeonfish. In cases where food is plentiful, it may feed in shoals, but in cases of scarcity, it may compete individually for food. It may use its surgeon's scalpel as a defensive weapon.

Economic value

The powder blue tang is rarely harvested for anything other than the marine aquarium industry. It is a commonly sold fish that is moderately difficult to care for, although its popularity is easily exceeded by the regal tang and yellow tang. They are very prone to Cryptocaryon irritans. They are reef safe and are compatible with most species except other species of fish in the genus Acanthurus.

References

Further reading

External links

Acanthurus leucosternon at Fishbase
Tang at Wetwebmedia.com
Powder Blue Tang
Atos Origin
http://www.marinespecies.org/aphia.php?p=taxdetails&id=219628
 

Acanthurus
Fish of the Indian Ocean
Taxa named by Edward Turner Bennett
Fish described in 1833